Interstate 990 (I-990) is an auxiliary Interstate Highway located entirely within the town of Amherst in Erie County, New York, in the United States. It runs in a roughly north–south direction for  through the southwestern and central parts of Amherst from an interchange with I-290 north of Buffalo to an intersection with New York Route 263 (NY 263, named Millersport Highway) south of Lockport. The highway serves as a connection between Buffalo, the University at Buffalo, and Lockport (via NY 263 and NY 78). Like I-590 in nearby Rochester, I-990 does not physically meet I-90, its parent Interstate Highway; instead, the highway makes the connection by way of a "sibling" highway (I-290). I-990 is the highest numbered Interstate Highway in the US. 

Plans for an expressway between Buffalo and Lockport were proposed as early as the late 1960s. By the time the road was added to the Interstate Highway System and designated I-990 in 1979, the proposal had been scaled back to a  freeway linking I-290 to North French Road. The route was constructed and opened to traffic in two stages during the 1980s. An extension to NY 263 was finished in 1990 and officially added to I-990 three years later.

Description

I-990 begins at a semi-directional T interchange (exit 4) with I-290 (Youngmann Expressway) in the Buffalo suburb of Amherst. After leaving the interchange, I-990, known as the Lockport Expressway, proceeds northward along the western edge of the University at Buffalo's Amherst Campus as a four-lane divided expressway. It generally parallels Sweet Home Road (unsigned NY 952T) to exit 1, a northbound-only interchange providing access to Audubon Parkway by way of a two-lane connector to the campus. From here, I-990 gradually bends northeastward, leaving the vicinity of the campus and entering a partial cloverleaf interchange (exit 2) connecting to Sweet Home Road.

The Interstate Highway continues to turn to the northeast as it heads away from exit 2, crossing over Ellicott Creek and Dodge Road (County Route 45). I-990 expands to six lanes just as it enters the nearby exit 3, which connects to Dodge Road and the northern end of the Audubon Parkway. The freeway briefly runs eastward from the junction, paralleling Dodge Road into the hamlet of Getzville, where the expressway passes over NY 270 (Campbell Boulevard). Just after the NY 270 crossing, I-990 bends northward once again and enters exit 4, a diamond interchange with North French Road (CR 299). 

Past North French Road, I-990 bends back to the northeast, crossing Hopkins Road (CR 87) as it approaches an at-grade intersection with NY 263 (Millersport Highway). The junction serves as I-990's exit 5 and its northern terminus. Traffic approaching the junction on northbound I-990 is diverted onto what was intended to be a single-lane exit ramp leading to NY 263. A small stub of highway exists east of the exit gore.

History

On October 30, 1968, the New York State Department of Transportation (NYSDOT) nominated 20 proposed highways to be added to the Interstate Highway System as part of a  nationwide system expansion authorized by the Federal-Aid Highway Act of 1968. When the city of Niagara Falls released its Regional Highway Plan for the Buffalo–Niagara Falls area in 1971, the Niagara Falls–Rochester highway was scrapped; as a result, the north end of the Lockport Expressway was moved to a point on NY 31 east of Lockport. In between I-290 and NY 31, the highway would intersect the proposed Belt Expressway and NY 78 (Transit Road).

While the outer belt proposal was mostly dropped, the plans to build the Lockport Expressway gained traction in January 1979 when the  portion between I-290 and North French Road was added to the Interstate Highway System and designated as I-990. The remainder of the original  route was excluded due to a lack of funding. Construction began in 1980 on the part south of Sweet Home Road, and the highway was opened to traffic by 1985. The section leading northeast to North French Road was built during the mid-1980s and completed by 1990. In 1986, NYSDOT began to evaluate ways to improve the highways surrounding the northern terminus of I-990. One of the potential options was an extension of the freeway to NY 263 (Millersport Highway) southwest of Lockport. This option was ultimately selected, and the new section of the freeway was opened to traffic on December 21, 1990. It was officially added to I-990 on October 22, 1993.

In June 2013, I-990 was renamed from the Lockport Expressway to the Staff Sergeant William R. Wilson III Memorial Highway. This is in honor of his contributions to the US military, which included training Afghan soldiers and police to take over the country's security. Staff Sergeant Wilson also served two combat deployments to Iraq as part of Operation Iraqi Freedom. As a result, he was posthumously awarded the Bronze Star Medal and Purple Heart. He also received the National Defense Service Medal, Iraq Campaign Medal, and the Afghanistan Campaign Medal, as well as the Army Service Ribbon and Overseas Service Ribbon. The bill to rename I-990 was sponsored by State Senator Michael Ranzenhofer and Assemblyman Raymond Walter. Signage is now displayed at each terminus showing the new name.

Exit list

See also

References

External links

Interstate-Guide: I-990

Transportation in Buffalo, New York
Transportation in Erie County, New York
90-9
90-9
9